The 2015 Driedaagse van West-Vlaanderen was the 69th edition of the Driedaagse van West-Vlaanderen cycling stage race. Rated as a 2.1 event by the UCI as part of the UCI Europe Tour, the race took place from 6 to 8 March 2015.

The defending champion was Gert Jõeäär, who won the 2014 race, which used a very similar course, after victory in the opening time trial. He was succeeded in 2015 by Yves Lampaert, who came fourth in the prologue, won the first road stage of the race from a breakaway and defended his race lead in the final stage. As well as winning the overall classification, he won the points, youth and West Flanders classifications, while his team won the teams classification.

Teams 
24 teams were selected to take part in the race. Eight of these were UCI WorldTeams; 11 were UCI Professional Continental teams; five were UCI Continental teams.

Route 
The 2015 race included three stages. The first of these was a  prologue individual time trial, which was followed by two road stages. The first road stage was mostly flat, except for the climb of the Oude Kwaremont midway through. The second similarly included three hills (the Rodeberg, the Kemmelberg and the Monteberg) in the middle part of the race, with a finale that again included some small climbs.

Stages

Prologue 
6 March 2015 — Middelkerke to Middelkerke, individual time trial (ITT)

The first stage of the race was a  prologue individual time trial in Middelkerke. The course was an out-and-back route along the northern Belgian coast; it took place in sunny conditions with some gusts of wind.

The time trial was won by Anton Vorobyev, the first professional win of his career. He was the only rider to complete the course in under eight minutes. Jesse Sergent finished second, with Jan Bárta third.

Stage 1 
7 March 2015 — Bruges to Harelbeke, 

The first road stage of the race was a  route from Bruges to Harelbeke. The principal difficulties came in the middle part of the stage, with the Oude Kwaremont the most significant climb.

An early breakaway was formed of four riders: Tim Kerkhof, Gijs Van Hoecke, Alistair Slater and Gorik Gardeyn. They were not allowed a significant advantage by the peloton and were caught after  of racing. The main break of the day was then formed with  remaining by five riders: Yves Lampaert, Tosh Van der Sande, Alexis Gougeard, Sander Cordeel and Mirko Selvaggi. The peloton was never quite able to make contact with the breakaway, which was reanimated by a sprint for an intermediate sprint. Cordeel attacked in the final kilometre, but was unable to create a gap. Lampaert followed Van der Sande's wheel and was able to pass him in the final metres to take the stage win. The peloton finished four seconds later.

Thanks to the lead over the peloton and the bonus seconds for the stage win, Lampaert took over the overall lead of the race from Vorobyev, as well as the lead of the points and young riders classification.

Stage 2 
8 March 2015 — Nieuwpoort to Ichtegem, 
The final stage of the race was a  route between Nieuwpoort and Ichtegem. The middle part of the race included some difficult climbs, including the Rodeberg, Kemmelberg and Monteberg. The race then finished with three laps of a circuit in Ichtegem that contained two moderate climbs.

An early break was formed by Tim Kerkhof, Louis Verhelst, Riccardo Stacchiotti, Jimmy Engoulvent, Jelle Wallays, Edwig Cammaerts and Stef Van Zummeren. They gained a four-minute lead over the peloton. There were then attacks from the peloton, with seventeen more riders joining the front group. These included Lampaert, the race leader, and three teammates. In the final circuits of the race, however, these riders were brought to the main peloton and the stage ended in a bunch sprint. This was won by Danny van Poppel, led out by his brother Boy van Poppel.

Lampaert finished in eleventh place on the stage, securing his victory in the race and also taking the youth and points classifications.

Classification leadership table 
There were four major rankings awarded in the 2015 Driedaagse van West-Vlaanderen. A yellow jersey was awarded to the general classification leader (time bonuses were awarded on the road stages at the stage finish and on intermediate sprints); a green jersey was awarded to the points classification leader (points were won at stage finishes and intermediate sprints); a red jersey was awarded to the sprints classification leader (points won at intermediate sprints only); and a black jersey was awarded to the best young rider in the general classification. A white jersey was also awarded to the best local rider after each stage, but this was not worn during racing.

Notes

References

External links 

 

Driedaagse van West-Vlaanderen
Driedaagse van West-Vlaanderen
Dwars door West-Vlaanderen